Penicillium raistrickii is an anamorph species of fungus in the genus Penicillium which produces griseofulvin, patulin and verruculogen.

References

Further reading 
 
 
 
 
 
 

raistrickii
Fungi described in 1933